{{DISPLAYTITLE:Upsilon1 Cassiopeiae}}

Upsilon1 Cassiopeiae (υ1 Cassiopeiae) is an astrometric binary star system in the northern constellation of Cassiopeia. It is  visible to the naked eye with an apparent visual magnitude of 4.82. Based upon an annual parallax shift of 9.93 mas as seen from Earth, this system is located about 330 light years from the Sun.

The visible component is an evolved K-type giant star with a stellar classification of K2 III. With an estimated age of 4.75 billion years, it is a red clump star that is generating energy through the fusion of helium at its core. At the estimated distance of the star, this yields a physical size of about 21 times the radius of the Sun. It has 1.39 times the mass of the Sun and is radiating 174 times the Sun's luminosity from its expanded photosphere at an effective temperature of 4,422 K.

There is a magnitude 12.50 visual companion at an angular separation of 17.80 arc seconds along a position angle of 61°, as of 2003. A more distant magnitude 12.89 companion lies at a separation of 93.30 arc seconds along a position angle of 125°, as measured in 2003. Neither star appears to be physically associated with υ1 Cas.

References

K-type giants
Horizontal-branch stars
Binary stars
Cassiopeiae, Upsilon1
Cassiopeia (constellation)
Durchmusterung objects
Cassiopeiae, 26
005234
004292
0253
Astrometric binaries